Fort Belvoir Community Hospital is a Department of Defense medical facility located on Fort Belvoir, Virginia, outside of Washington D.C. In conjunction with Walter Reed National Military Medical Center, Belvoir provides the Military Health System medical capabilities of the National Capital Region Medical Directorate (NCR MD), a joint unit providing comprehensive care to members of the United States Armed Forces located in the capital area, and their families. The facility is located on a U.S. Army installation, but operates as one of the first joint service medical facilities in the U.S. military, staffed with uniformed medical personnel from the Army, Navy, and Air Force. The hospital is one of the largest medical facilities in Northern Virginia, and provides all levels of inpatient and outpatient medical care. The facility maintains a 24 hour emergency department but, like most U.S. military hospitals, transfers patients in need of a trauma center to equipped civilian medical facilities. As part of federal emergency planning in the National Capitol Region, the hospital is also tasked with maintaining unique capabilities to support continuity of government operations in the event of crisis.

The $1.03 billion, 1.3 million-square-foot facility opened in August 2011, replacing Fort Belvoir's existing medical facility, DeWitt Army Community Hospital, and integrating significant portions of the former Walter Reed Army Medical Center in Washington, D.C., in accordance with 2005 Base Realignment and Closure Act. In addition to its primary facility at Fort Belvoir, the hospital also operates the DiLorenzo TRICARE Health Clinic (DTHC) at the Pentagon and satellite health centers in Fairfax and Dumfries, Virginia.

History
The former DeWitt Army Community Hospital at Fort Belvoir, VA., which Fort Belvoir Community Hospital replaced, was named in honor of Brigadier General Wallace DeWitt Sr., (1878–1949), a surgeon who served in both World War I and II.

The DeWitt Army Community Hospital opened in 1957, having cost $4.5 million to construct. It was the second of nine hospitals planned by the Army during the building program following the Korean War.
DeWitt was a 46-bed Joint Commission-accredited facility and the only military inpatient facility in Northern Virginia. It was the center of the DeWitt Health Care Network, which featured the Andrew Rader Army Health Clinic at Fort Myer, Fort A.P. Hill, and the Family Health Centers of Woodbridge and Fairfax in Virginia.As part of a Base Realignment and Closure announcement on May 13, 2005, the Department of Defense proposed closing Walter Reed Army Medical Center (WRAMC) and merging it with the National Naval Medical Center located in Bethesda, MD, as well as replacing DeWitt Army Community Hospital. Moving nearly half of Walter Reed's services to DeWitt would greatly expand the hospital's mission. In November 2007, ground was broken on Fort Belvoir's South Post golf course for the new Fort Belvoir Community Hospital.

As part of the effort to transform service specific medical facilities into joint service facilities, Fort Belvoir Community Hospital's staff includes Army, Navy, and Air Force medical personnel, making it one of the first joint medical facilities within the Department of Defense.

Structure

The modern, 120-bed facility was designed by HDR, Inc. and is LEED Gold certified, incorporating sustainable and natural elements and themes. Fort Belvoir's new hospital has a seven-story main structure, flanked on each side by two outpatient clinic areas providing both primary and specialty care. In total, it consists of five total buildings, 3500 parking spaces, 44 clinics, expanded pharmacy services, 430 exam rooms, 10 operating rooms, two DaVinci surgical systems, two linear accelerator cancer/oncology systems, and one of the military's only dedicated substance abuse programs.  
 
Inpatient services were tripled in volume over the old hospital, and the expanded outpatient specialty care center offers services as a more local and convenient alternative than Walter Reed National Military Medical Center, which is located over 30 miles away on congested highways. The hospital incorporates evidence-based design principles in its treatment approach.

Visits/Capacity
Department of Defense officials project the eligible beneficiary population will increase to more than 220,000 with approximately 40 percent of the expanded health care system enrolled population consisting of retirees and their family members. The anticipated outpatient workload is expected to grow to more than 600,000 visits per year in primary, specialty and ancillary clinics.

Selected specialty clinics such as Cardiology, Medical Oncology, Pulmonary, Radiation Oncology and Urology alone will generate approximately 54,000 appointments per year. The hospital's Labor and Delivery service delivered 104 babies in its first month of operations.

References

External links
 

Hospital buildings completed in 1957
Government buildings completed in 1957
Buildings and structures in Fairfax County, Virginia
United States Army medical installations
Military hospitals in the United States
Hospitals established in 1957